Angelo Smith is a Fijian rugby union player, currently playing for the . His preferred position is lock.

Early career
Smith attended Marist Brothers High School and St Thomas High School, where he was a teammate of Fiji international Chris Minimbi. After visiting family in New Zealand, Smith was invited to feature for the New Zealand Fiji Schoolboys team, although he could not raise enough money to join the academy in New Zealand full time.

Professional career
Smith received his big break when representing Wests Rugby in the Hospital Cup, where the Wests ended a 16-year drought to win the trophy. With the Wests side having a close connection with the Melbourne Rebels side, he was first offered a pre-season contract with the club for the 2022 off-season.

Smith has also represented Fiji U20s.

References

External links
itsrugby.co.uk Profile

Living people
Fijian rugby union players
Rugby union locks
Melbourne Rebels players